In Greek mythology, the Hyades (popularly "rain-makers" or "the rainy ones"; from , but probably from ) are a sisterhood of nymphs that bring rain.

Family 
The Hyades were daughters of Atlas (by either Pleione or Aethra, one of the Oceanides) and sisters of Hyas in most tellings, although one version gives their parents as Hyas and Boeotia. The Hyades are sisters to the Pleiades and the Hesperides.

Names 
Their number varies from three in the earliest sources to fifteen in the late ones. The names are also variable, according to the mythographer, and include:

Additionally, Thyone and Prodice were supposed to be daughters of Hyas by Aethra, and have been added to the group of stars.

Mythology 
The main myth concerning them is envisioned to account for their collective name and to provide an etiology for their weepy raininess: Hyas was killed in a hunting accident and the Hyades wept from their grief. They were changed into a cluster of stars, the Hyades, set in the head of Taurus.

The Greeks believed that the heliacal rising and setting of the Hyades star cluster were always attended with rain, hence the association of the Hyades (sisters of Hyas) and the Hyades (daughters of ocean) with the constellation of the Hyades (rainy ones).

The Hyades are also thought to have been the tutors of Dionysus, in some tellings of the latter's infancy, and as such are equated with the Nysiads, the nymphs who are also believed to have cared for Dionysus, as well as with other reputed nurses of the god—the Lamides, the Dodonides and the nymphs of Naxos. Some sources relate that they were subject to aging, but Dionysus, to express his gratitude for having raised him, asked Medea to restore their youth.

In Tennyson's poem, Ulysses recalls his travels of old: 

"I cannot rest from travel: I will drink -
Life to the lees: All times I have enjoy'd -
Greatly, have suffer'd greatly, both with those - 
That loved me, and alone, on shore, and when -
Thro' scudding drifts the rainy Hyades -
Vext the dim sea ..."

In astronomy 

A well-studied star cluster in Taurus and the open cluster nearest Earth is named after the Hyades of Greek mythology.

Notes

References

 Apollodorus, The Library with an English Translation by Sir James George Frazer, F.B.A., F.R.S. in 2 Volumes, Cambridge, MA, Harvard University Press; London, William Heinemann Ltd. 1921. ISBN 0-674-99135-4. Online version at the Perseus Digital Library. Greek text available from the same website.
 Diodorus Siculus, The Library of History translated by Charles Henry Oldfather. Twelve volumes. Loeb Classical Library. Cambridge, Massachusetts: Harvard University Press; London: William Heinemann, Ltd. 1989. Vol. 3. Books 4.59–8. Online version at Bill Thayer's Web Site
 Diodorus Siculus, Bibliotheca Historica. Vol 1-2. Immanel Bekker. Ludwig Dindorf. Friedrich Vogel. in aedibus B. G. Teubneri. Leipzig. 1888-1890. Greek text available at the Perseus Digital Library.
 Gaius Julius Hyginus, Astronomica from The Myths of Hyginus translated and edited by Mary Grant. University of Kansas Publications in Humanistic Studies. Online version at the Topos Text Project.
 Gaius Julius Hyginus, Fabulae from The Myths of Hyginus translated and edited by Mary Grant. University of Kansas Publications in Humanistic Studies. Online version at the Topos Text Project.
 Graves, Robert, The Greek Myths, Harmondsworth, London, England, Penguin Books, 1960. 
 Graves, Robert, The Greek Myths: The Complete and Definitive Edition. Penguin Books Limited. 2017. 
 Hesiod, Works and Days from The Homeric Hymns and Homerica with an English Translation by Hugh G. Evelyn-White, Cambridge, MA.,Harvard University Press; London, William Heinemann Ltd. 1914. Online version at the Perseus Digital Library. Greek text available from the same website.
 Marcus Tullius Cicero, Nature of the Gods from the Treatises of M.T. Cicero translated by Charles Duke Yonge (1812-1891), Bohn edition of 1878. Online version at the Topos Text Project.
 Marcus Tullius Cicero, De Natura Deorum. O. Plasberg. Leipzig. Teubner. 1917.  Latin text available at the Perseus Digital Library.
 Publius Ovidius Naso, Fasti translated by James G. Frazer. Online version at the Topos Text Project.
 Publius Ovidius Naso, Fasti. Sir James George Frazer. London; Cambridge, MA. William Heinemann Ltd.; Harvard University Press. 1933. Latin text available at the Perseus Digital Library.
 Publius Ovidius Naso, Metamorphoses translated by Brookes More (1859-1942). Boston, Cornhill Publishing Co. 1922. Online version at the Perseus Digital Library.
 Publius Ovidius Naso, Metamorphoses. Hugo Magnus. Gotha (Germany). Friedr. Andr. Perthes. 1892. Latin text available at the Perseus Digital Library.
 Smith, William; Dictionary of Greek and Roman Biography and Mythology, London (1873). "Hyades"
 Suida, Suda Encyclopedia translated by Ross Scaife, David Whitehead, William Hutton, Catharine Roth, Jennifer Benedict, Gregory Hays, Malcolm Heath Sean M. Redmond, Nicholas Fincher, Patrick Rourke, Elizabeth Vandiver, Raphael Finkel, Frederick Williams, Carl Widstrand, Robert Dyer, Joseph L. Rife, Oliver Phillips and many others. Online version at the Topos Text Project.

Nymphs
Children of Atlas
 
Deeds of Zeus
Hyades (star cluster)
Metamorphoses in Greek mythology